Kaori Kodaira (小平花織 Kodaira Kaori, born April 13, 1990) is a Japanese volleyball player who plays for Toray Arrows.

Clubs
  Tokai University Daisan Senior High School
  Toray Arrows (2009–)

External links
 Toray Arrows Women's Volleyball Team

1990 births
Living people
People from Nagano (city)
Japanese women's volleyball players